Hans-Albrecht Lehmann (6 February 1894–27 November 1976) was a German general during the Second World War.

Biography
Lehmann was born on 6 February 1894 in Metz in Lorraine. Lehmann served in the First World War with the Imperial German Army. After the war, he continued his career in the army, gradually climbing the ranks. Lehmann was appointed commander of the "Nachrichtentruppe I", in Königsberg, on 1 April 1938. Lehmann was an Oberstleutnant on the eve of the Second World War. As an Oberst in the Sixteenth German Army, Lehmann received the Deutsches Kreuz in silver, on 25 March 1943. Thanks to his leadership skills, Lehmann was shortly afterwards promoted Generalmajor, on 1 September 1943.

Lehmann died in 1976, at Garmisch-Partenkirchen, in Bavaria.

Decorations
 Eisernes Kreuz (1914), 2nd and 1st classes
 Eisernen Kreuz (1939), 2nd and 1st classes
 Deutsches kreuz in Silver, on 25 March 1943.

References

Sources 
 Dermot Bradley: Die Generale des Heeres 1921-1945, Band 7, Knabe-Luz; Biblio Verlag, Bissendorf, 2004 (p. 430-431).

1894 births
1976 deaths
German Army personnel of World War I
Prussian Army personnel
Major generals of the German Army (Wehrmacht)
Military personnel from Metz
People from Alsace-Lorraine
German police officers
Recipients of the clasp to the Iron Cross, 1st class
German prisoners of war in World War II held by the United States
Recipients of the German Cross
German Army generals of World War II